TV Reader's Digest  is the title of a 30-minute American television anthology drama series, which aired on the ABC from 1955 to 1956.  Its theme music was "Polonaise" from Act III of Eugene Onegin.

Based on articles that appeared in Reader's Digest magazine, the episodes were true stories that were varied in their themes, plots, and content. Themes included crime, heroism, mystery, romance, and human interest. Episode writers included Frederick Hazlitt Brennan, Cleveland Amory, and Frank Gruber.

Some of the actors who were cast in the episodes include Claude Akins, Leon Askin, Jean Byron, Chuck Connors, Peter Graves,  John Howard, Vivi Janiss (as Mary Todd Lincoln in "How Chance Made Lincoln President"), Lee Marvin, Francis McDonald, Martin Milner,  Jerry Paris, Gene Raymond, Max Showalter, and Michael Winkelman. Clint Eastwood made his first Western appearance as Lt. Wilson in the episode "Cochise, Greatest of the Apaches", which aired January 30, 1956.

External links 
 
 TV.com: TV Reader's Digest
 TV Reader's Digest at CVTA with episode list

1950s American drama television series
1950s American anthology television series
1955 American television series debuts
1956 American television series endings
American Broadcasting Company original programming
Black-and-white American television shows
Reader's Digest
Television shows based on magazines